Friburguense Atlético Clube, or Friburguense as they are usually called, is a Brazilian football team from Nova Friburgo in Rio de Janeiro, founded on March 14, 1980.

They currently play in the Campeonato Carioca and play their games at the Estadio Eduardo Guinle, which has a capacity for 10,000.

History

Friburguense Atlético Clube was founded on March 14, 1980 after Fluminense Atlético Clube (founded in 1921) and Serrano Futebol Clube (founded in 1934) fused.

As Fluminense, the team participated in the 1979 Campeonato Carioca, and Friburguense participated in the 1980 and 1981 editions, both of the times being eliminated in the preliminary stage. In 1984, the club competed in the Campeonato Carioca First Division, but finished in the 11th place, and was relegated. The team returned in 1988, only to be relegated again.

In 1997, Friburguense won its first title. The club won the Campeonato Carioca Second Division, after defeating Ceres in the final (1-0 in the first leg, and 1-1 in the second leg), and was promoted to the 1998 first division.

In 2005, for the first time in the club's history, Friburguense competed in the Copa do Brasil. The club was eliminated in the second round by Internacional, after a 1-1 draw in Nova Friburgo, and a 4-0 defeat in Porto Alegre. In the first round, the club beat Caldense 4-1 in the first leg, and 1-2 in the second leg).

Former players
  Ronan
 Bernardo Ribeiro
 Têti

Achievements
Campeonato Carioca Série A2:
 Winners (2): 1997, 2019

External links
Official Site

 
Association football clubs established in 1980
Football clubs in Rio de Janeiro (state)
1980 establishments in Brazil